"Wings" (stylized as "Wing$") is a song by American hip hop duo Macklemore & Ryan Lewis, released as the debut single from their first studio album The Heist.

Context
Macklemore explained how the subject of the single as follows:

Music video
The music video, directed by Zia Mohajerjasbi, alludes to an autobiographical story line. It depicts its main character (Macklemore) and his experiences as a young boy infatuated with basketball and basketball paraphernalia, athletic shoes in particular, and what adverse effect it had on him as he grew up.

The music video starts with Macklemore now a grown-up man, going into an empty basketball court, where the indications are, that he apparently used to practice basketball himself. Macklemore raps while he reminisces himself as a small kid wearing a Chicago Bulls jersey number 23 (clearly alluding to NBA player Michael Jordan) and wearing, in a close-up, Nike sneakers that would "make him fly" (another reference to Nike Air Jordan sneakers). He describes "touching the net" as being the "best day of my life" (also a sample of a Jordan typical Nike ad), boasting about his skills to his mother and friends... until that is "my friend Carlos' brother got murdered for his fours, whoa", a reference to the basketball shoes he was wearing. This incident becomes a wake-up call to young Macklemore.

Then the music video shows kids and youth practicing because they wish "to fly".

The following scenes display a grown-up man (Macklemore) instructing youth in an apparent awareness campaign meeting them in a hair salon or while traveling on a bus, talking to them through an open book what he thinks is essential and what is secondary, warning them of the consequences of consumerism, particularly regarding basketball sneakers.

The music video then shows a flashback of the young kid back in school wearing Seattle SuperSonics apparel. On his way back home all alone, he is followed by three juveniles eyeing him. Then there is a scene where the kid has been roughed up and his sneakers stolen as he walks home only with his socks on. Reaching home, he can barely take off his socks to wear a new clean pair. The choosing of the Sonics jersey is poignant to add further autobiographical aspect to the music video again showing that it is about Macklemore's own experiences and about a friend that he knew.

Then there is a camera cut back to other young boys and girls in "Niketown" in front of a catchy Nike display saying "JUST DO IT." Then back a final flashback at the young kid wearing a Nike pair dreaming of his first day in school.

The final shot is back to the original scene at the basketball court with Macklemore still rapping as a grown and much wiser man.

The music video is full of basketball memorabilia including promotional snapshots of Michael Jordan, many posters of Jordan with wide openly stretched arms, and a #23 jersey, a picture Macklemore replicates himself on cover of the release, with him wearing the #23 Chicago Bulls jersey with a snapshot with exactly the same pose as that of Jordan.

"Wings" (NBA All-Star Weekend Edition) (2013)
An alternative version of this song was used for commercials involving the 2013 NBA All-Star Game. It was heavily used in TNT television channel's promotion to the event and at the event itself. The promotional film with Macklemore wearing the West #3 Chris Paul (eventual MVP of the All Star Game) red jersey, is shown in a new video accompanied by a young choir wearing All Star T-shirts. Macklemore showed up the day of the shooting of the video in a middle school gym in Los Angeles where he says that he was informed that they might:

Macklemore was criticized for agreeing to this heavily edited new version in which almost all negative references to Nike were edited out, or taken out of context, with the resulting video becoming a promotional piece for the NBA.

Macklemore responded in a lengthy message to the criticism levelled against him of "selling out". In a very candid piece entitled "Wing$, the NBA All-Star Game, & Selling Out" dated 21 February 2013, and signed by Macklemore himself and published on his official website, Macklemore addressed many of the concerns of the critics. He says:

Charts and certifications

Weekly charts

Certifications

Release history

References

2011 debut singles
Macklemore songs
Ryan Lewis songs
Songs written by Macklemore
Songs written by Ryan Lewis
2010 songs
Songs about consumerism